Jacob Jensen Jersin (1633–1694) was a Danish-Norwegian theologian and priest.  He served as a bishop of the newly created Diocese of Christianssand from 1682 until his death in 1694.

Personal life
Jacob Jensen Jersin was born in 1633 in Ribe, Denmark and he was baptized in church on 5 July of the same year. Jersin married Adelheid Borchardsen on 5 October 1664.

Education and career
He graduated from a school in the town of Sorø in 1652.  In 1663, he received his magister's degree.  In 1664, he was hired as a parish priest in Kalundborg.  On 25 October 1680, he was unexpectedly called to become the Bishop of the Diocese of Stavanger, based in the city of Stavanger in Norway.  Several months later, he began his new job.  Then on 6 May 1682, about a year after beginning his job as bishop, the King of Denmark-Norway announced that the Bishop's seat was moving to the new town of Christianssand, and the diocese was to be renamed the Diocese of Christianssand.  This was a somewhat controversial move, and the people of Stavanger protested and the Bishop and diocesan officials refused to move for two years.  By 1684, however, the bishop finally relented and they moved the episcopal seat to the new Christianssand Cathedral.  He died on 21 July 1694 while visiting the parish of Skien.

References

1633 births
1694 deaths
Bishops of Agder og Telemark
Bishops of Stavanger
17th-century Lutheran bishops